Divisions is the third studio album by American rock band Starset. It was released on September 13, 2019. It spawned two singles "Manifest" and "Trials", which peaked at number 14 and 8 respectively on the Billboard Mainstream Rock chart. Loudwire named it one of the 50 best rock albums of 2019.

Background and concept
Plans for a third studio album were revealed as early as January 2018, though frontman Dustin Bates stated its release would be far in the future, as he was taking a break from Starset to release a side-project electronic album under the moniker of "MNQN". Talks of a third album arose again in August 2018, upon the band's announcement of the re-release of their second album, Vessels, as Vessels 2.0. Shortly after the April 2019 release of MNQN material, in May 2019, the band announced that the third album was scheduled for release on September 13, 2019. The album's title, Divisions, was announced on August 15, 2019. The album's first single, "Manifest", was released the same day, alongside its music video. The album is the first to feature session drummer Luke Holland.

Much like the band's prior two albums, the album conceptually refers to frontman Dustin Bates' fictional story about a dystopian future struggling with the misuse of technology. The music video for "Manifest" established the setting of New West, where denizens of a work camp are mind controlled into compliance through technology embedded into their heads, while others start to stage a rebellion. Three other songs, "Where the Skies End", "Diving Bell", and "Stratosphere" were released in the leadup to the album, with accompanying music videos featuring citizens from various socioeconomic backgrounds affected by the mind control technology.

Track listing

Notes
 All track titles are stylized in all uppercase.

Personnel 
Musicians

 Dustin Bates – vocals, backing vocals, production
 Joe Rickard – programming; drums (track 12)
 Alex Niceford – programming
 Igor Khoroshev – additional programming
 Niels Nielsen – additional programming
 Paul Trust – additional programming, interlude music
 Randy Torres – interlude sound design
 Ron DeChant – backing vocals
 Brock Richards – backing vocals
 JR Bareis – guitars
 Lucio Rubino – bass; guitars (track 12)
 Luke Holland – drums
 David Davidson – strings arrangement and violin (all except tracks 7 and 12)
 Conni Ellisor – violin (all except tracks 7 and 12)
 Karen Winkelmann – violin (all except tracks 7 and 12)
 Janet Darnall – violin (all except tracks 7 and 12)
 Betsy Lamb – viola (all except tracks 7 and 12)
 Simona Russo – viola (all except tracks 7 and 12)
 Carole Rabinowitz – cello (all except tracks 7 and 12)
 Sari Reist – cello (all except tracks 7 and 12)

Technical

 Dustin Bates – production
 Joe Rickard – co-production (track 2), engineering, digital editing, guitars engineering
 Nick Chiari – co-production (track 11)
 Dan Lancaster – mixing
 Rhys May – mixing assistance
 Paul Decarli – digital editing
 Taylor Pollert – string recording
 Dave Schiffman – drums engineering
 Mike Plotnikoff – guitars engineering
 Michael Closson III – assistant engineering
 Niels Nielsen – mastering
 Tnsn Dvsn – creative direction, album art and package

Charts

References

2019 albums
Fearless Records albums
Starset albums